Emil Baumgärtel (10 January 1885 in Wernersreuth, Austro-Hungarian Empire – 27 September 1939 in Vienna, Austria) was an Austrian politician for the Social Democratic Party of Austria (SPÖ). Baumgärtel attended a two-class village school and was trained as a bookseller. He became a bookseller in Wrocław, Frankfurt, and Vienna. In 1919, he was vice chairman of the Workers' council for Upper Austria. From 1919 to 1925, he was a member of the Upper Austrian parliament, and also as a provincial Deputy Provincial. From 10 November 1920 to 17 February 1934, he was a Member of the National Council. He was also vice president of the Austrian Chamber of Labour. In 2001, a street in Linz was named after him.

External links
  
 Archive of Emil Baumgärtel Papers at the International Institute of Social History

References

1885 births
1939 deaths
People from Aš
People from the Kingdom of Bohemia
German Bohemian people
Social Democratic Party of Austria politicians
Members of the National Council (Austria)